The South East Asian Volleyball Association, is the governing body for the sports of indoor, beach and grass volleyball in Southeast Asia.

In the spirit of the FIVB 2001 Plan, AVC was the first to create five Zonal Associations at the 10th General Assembly in December 1993 prior to the FIVB Centennial Congress in September 1994.

Members

Ranking

Men's national teams

Senior team
Rankings are calculated by FIVB.

Last Update on 26 May 2022

Women's national teams

Senior team
Rankings are calculated by FIVB.

Last updated 26 May 2022

Executive committee

Competitions

Volleyball

Beach volleyball

See also  

 Central Asian Volleyball Association
 East Asian Zonal Volleyball Association
 Oceania Zonal Volleyball Association

References

External links
 

Sports organizations established in 1993
1993 establishments in Asia
Volleyball in Asia